Robert G. Sachs (May 4, 1916 – April 14, 1999) was an American theoretical physicist, a founder and a director of the Argonne National Laboratory.
Sachs was also notable for his work in theoretical nuclear physics, terminal ballistics, and nuclear power reactors.
Sachs was also a member of the National Academy of Sciences, chairman of the Academy's Physics Section, chairman of the Academy's Class I (Physical and Mathematical Sciences), and director of the Enrico Fermi Institute of the University of Chicago.
Sachs was the author of the standard textbook Nuclear Theory (1953).

Notable honors and awards
 Guggenheim fellow
 honorary Ph.D., Purdue University (1967)
 elected a member to the National Academy of Sciences (1971)
 honorary Ph.D., University of Illinois (1977)
 honorary Ph.D., Elmhurst College (1987)

Life and career
 Born in Hagerstown, Maryland
 Ph.D. from Johns Hopkins University in 1939

References

Further reading

External links

Sachs, Robert Green, 1916- at Physics History Network, American Institute of Physics

1916 births
1999 deaths
People from Hagerstown, Maryland
20th-century American physicists
Purdue University faculty
University of Chicago faculty
Johns Hopkins University alumni
Members of the United States National Academy of Sciences
Fellows of the American Physical Society

Theoretical physicists